John Albert "Jack" Culpin (4 October 1927 – 2 September 2014) was an Australian politician.

Born in Collingwood to postal officer Albert Culpin and his wife Leura, he worked as an electrical fitter and was a shop steward with the Electrical Trades Union for twenty years. On 23 June 1951 he married June Marie Ballard (Deceased), with whom he had four sons Gary, Trevor, Rodney (Deceased) & Dale. In 1961 he was elected to Broadmeadows City Council, serving until 1978; he was mayor from 1965 to 1966. In 1976 he was elected to the Victorian Legislative Assembly as the Labor member for Glenroy, shifting to Broadmeadows in 1985. He resigned from the Labor Party in 1988 and was defeated as an independent candidate.

Jack Culpin died in Melbourne on 2 September 2014.

References

1927 births
2014 deaths
Trade unionists from Melbourne
Independent members of the Parliament of Victoria
Members of the Victorian Legislative Assembly
People from Melbourne
Australian Labor Party members of the Parliament of Victoria